Doña Soledad Avenue is an east-west route in the southern Metro Manila city of Parañaque, Philippines. It traverses barangays Don Bosco and Moonwalk, both located in northeastern Parañaque. It runs from its intersection with E. Rodriguez Avenue in the eastern edge of Moonwalk. The road continues to the east, entering Better Living Subdivision. It then curves north for a few blocks, then turns east and heads for its terminus at Bicutan Exit of South Luzon Expressway (SLEX) and Skyway. East of SLEX, the avenue continues as East Service Road into San Martin de Porres and Lower Bicutan in Taguig, where it then continues as General Santos Avenue.

It was intended to be a private road meant for Better Living Subdivision residents, but was opened to outsiders because of the heavy traffic when Dr. A. Santos Avenue (Sucat Road) was expanded. This caused poor road conditions on the private road and it is also plagued with heavy traffic due to non-residents passing by. Better Living residents are hoping to have Doña Soledad Avenue be a private road again in the upcoming years with limited (through subdivision sticker) or tolled access to finance extensive rehabilitation.

Name

The avenue was named after Doña Soledad Lirio Dolor, a former assemblywoman from Batangas, landowner, and real estate developer who pursued several subdivision projects, including Better Living in Parañaque where this road passes. It is also sometimes referred to by non-Parañaqueños as Bicutan Road because it is the road that goes to and from Bicutan.

Traffic concerns
Starting the early 2000s, there has been a continued buildup of traffic along Doña Soledad Avenue. This can be attributed to the increasing number of homeowners and tenants within the Better Living subdivision and adjacent properties that use the avenue.

Conversely, a high volume of pass-thru vehicular traffic has been observed. Most of these are private and delivery vehicles that use the avenue as a shortcut to and from Ninoy Aquino International Airport.

As of 2015, it can take approximately two hours to traverse the  avenue during rush hours (from 6AM-10AM and from 6PM-10PM) by commute.

Four new property developments once completed can also add to the volume of traffic which clogs the avenue. These are: 
 Azure Urban Resort Residences - located at the West Service Road near the intersection with Doña Soledad Avenue
 Amaia Steps Bicutan - located at the West Service Road corner Sun Valley Drive
 Amaranthe Land Development - located at the East Service Road near the DOST campus
 SMDC Spring Residences - located at the West Service Road next to SM City Bicutan

Landmarks
 Azure Urban Resort Residences 
 Château Élysée
 Parañaque Doctors Hospital
 PLDT - North Parañaque Office
 Skyway Operations and Maintenance Corporation
 SM City Bicutan
 National Shrine of Mary Help of Christians

References

Streets in Metro Manila